The Former Residence of Tan Sitong or Tan Sitong's Former Residence was built in the late Ming dynasty (1368–1644). It is located in Liuyang, Hunan.

History
From age 15 to 17, Tan Sitong lived here.

In November 1996, it was listed as a "Major Historical and Cultural Site Protected at the National Level" by the State Council of China.

In April 2002, it was listed as a "Patriotic Education Base" by the Hunan Provincial People's Government.

Gallery

References

Bibliography
 

Buildings and structures in Liuyang
Tourist attractions in Changsha
Traditional folk houses in Hunan
Major National Historical and Cultural Sites in Hunan